This is a list of restaurant terminology. A restaurant is a business that prepares and serves food and drink to customers in return for money, either paid before the meal, after the meal, or with a running tab. Meals are generally served and eaten on premises, but many restaurants also offer take-out and food delivery services. Restaurants vary greatly in appearance and offerings, including a wide variety of the main chef's cuisines and service models.

Restaurant terminology

 86 – a term used when the restaurant has run out of, or is unable to prepare a particular menu item. Increasingly; when a bar patron is ejected from the premises and refused readmittance. Usually it is only for the rest of that night, though if the patron is especially violent, the ban may be for a longer term or even permanently.
 À la carte
 Bartender
 Blue-plate special
 Brigade de cuisine
 BYOB – an initialism standing for "bring your own bottle", "bring your own beer", "bring your own beverage", or "bring your own booze"
 Charcuterie
 Chef
 Chef de cuisine - also called "head chef" or "master chef"
 Chef's table
 Combination meal
 Cooked to order – food that is cooked to a patron's directions
 Counter meal
 Counter service
 Dine and dash
 Early bird dinner
 Entrée 
 Family meal
 Fast food
 Free lunch
 Garde manger
 Ghost restaurant – a restaurant that operates exclusively via food delivery
 Gueridon service
 Happy hour
 Kids' meal
 Main course
 Maître d'hôtel
 Meat and three
 Meat and two veg – a British dish consisting of meat served with two varieties of vegetables
 Menu
 Mise en place
 Monkey dish – a small (3" or 5 cm) bowl used for sauces, nuts, or as a repository for bones or citrus peel
 Omakase
 On the fly
 One bowl with two pieces
 Online food ordering
 Plate lunch
 Platter (dinner)
 Rôtisseur
 Saucier
 Serving cart
 Signature dish
 Sous-chef – the chef who is second in command within a kitchen; sous meaning "under"
 Table d'hôte – a menu in which multi-course meals with only a few choices are charged at a fixed total price
 Table reservation
 Table service
 Table sharing
 Take-out
 Three-martini lunch
 Value meal

See also

 Brigade de cuisine of Culinary arts
 Diner lingo – a kind of American verbal slang used by cooks
 Food industry
 Types of restaurants
 Waiting staff

References

Restaurant terminology
Food and drink terminology
Food- and drink-related lists